USS Cushing (Torpedo Boat #1/TB-1) was a torpedo boat in the United States Navy during the Spanish–American War. She was named for William B. Cushing.

Cushing was launched on 23 January 1890 by the Herreshoff Manufacturing Company, Bristol, Rhode Island; sponsored by Miss K. B. Herreshoff; and commissioned on 22 April 1890, Lieutenant C. M. Winslow in command.

Service history

The first torpedo boat built for the Navy, Cushing was attached to the Squadron of Evolution and equipped for experimental work to complete the development of torpedo outfits and to gather data for the service. On 8 September 1891, she reported to Newport, Rhode Island for duty at the Naval Torpedo Station, and except for a brief period out of commission—from 11 November 1891 – 11 January 1892—Cushing continued her torpedo experiments in this area until 1893.

Cushing arrived at Hampton Roads on 31 March 1893 for temporary duty with the Naval Review Fleet, and in April she escorted the British cruisers  and HMS Caravels to New York. Cushing returned to duty at Newport on 6 May, working with the Whitehead torpedo. Based on Key West from 31 December 1897, Cushing reported to the North Atlantic Fleet's Blockading Force for picket patrol in the Florida Straits and courier duty for the Force. On 11 February 1898, while making a passage to Havana, Cushing lost Ensign Joseph C. Breckinridge overboard in heavy seas. For their heroic efforts to save him, Gunner's Mate Third Class John Everetts and Ship's Cook First Class Daniel Atkins were awarded the Medal of Honor. The destroyer  was named after him in 1918.

Upon the declaration of war between the U.S. and Spain, Cushing was assigned to patrol the Cays, and on 7 August captured four small vessels and towed them to her anchorage at Piedras Cay. Four days later, armed boats from Cushing and  captured and burned a  schooner. Returning north in August 1898, Cushing resumed her operations at the Newport Torpedo Station from 14 September until decommissioned on 8 November 1898. From 1901 to 1911, she was attached to the Reserve Torpedo Flotilla at Norfolk, and was sunk on 24 September 1920 after use as a target.

References

 
 
 
 The White Squadron.  [Toledo, Ohio]: Woolson Spice Co., 1891. 
 Simpson, Richard V. Building The Mosquito Fleet, The US Navy's First Torpedo Boats. Arcadia Publishing, Charleston South Carolina, USA, 2001.  .
 Silverstone, Paul. U.S. Warships of World War I Ian Allen, London, U.K., 1970. .

External links

 
 USN Ships – USS Cushing (TB-1) 
 The USS Cushing Association
 Torpedo boat, USS Cushing, experiments with torpedoes  These are 8 photographs showing the Cushing torpedo boat experiments.

Torpedo boats of the United States Navy
Ships built in Bristol, Rhode Island
1890 ships
Maritime incidents in 1920
Shipwrecks
Ships sunk as targets